Boothspoint is an unincorporated community in Dyer County, Tennessee, in the United States.

History
A post office called Booth's Point was established in 1858, and remained in operation until it was discontinued in 1964. The community was likely named in honor of a local family.

References

Unincorporated communities in Dyer County, Tennessee
Unincorporated communities in Tennessee